Tehran County is a county in Tehran province of Iran. The capital of the county is the city Tehran. At the 2006 census, the county's population was 7,882,843 in 2,313,002 households. The following census in 2011 counted 8,293,140 people in 2,637,704 households. At the 2016 census, the county's population was 8,737,510 in 2,924,208 households, by which time most of the county outside the city of Tehran had been separated from the county to form Pardis County. Greater Tehran is situated mostly in Tehran County. It is the most populous county in Iran.

Administrative divisions

The population history and structural changes of Tehran County's administrative divisions over three consecutive censuses are shown in the following table. The latest census shows three districts, four rural districts, and one city.

References

 

Counties of Tehran Province